Dapper is an object–relational mapping (ORM) product for the Microsoft .NET platform: it provides a framework for mapping an object-oriented domain model to a traditional relational database. Its purpose is to relieve the developer from a significant portion of relational data persistence-related programming tasks. Dapper is free as open source software that is distributed under dual license, either the Apache License 2.0 or the MIT License.

Feature summary
The Dapper team advertises the following features:

 Speedy and high performance
 Choice of static/dynamic object binding
 Easy handling of SQL query
 Multiple query support
 Support and easy handling of stored procedures

See also

 List of object–relational mapping software
 .NET Persistence API (NPA)

References

External links
Dapper Homepage
NuGet Dapper package
Dapper Tutorial
Learn Dapper
Sam Saffron Blog: How I learned to stop worrying and write my own ORM

Free software programmed in C Sharp
.NET programming tools
.NET object-relational mapping tools
Object-relational mapping
C Sharp libraries